Karl & Co is a Norwegian situation comedy created by Tore Ryen, starring Nils Vogt reprising his role as Karl Reverud from the popular sitcom Mot i brøstet. It aired on TV 2, running for three seasons from 1998 to 2001, a total of 63 episodes.

Cast

Main
Nils Vogt as Karl Reverud
Knut Lystad as Ulf Rasch Ludvigsen
Harald Heide-Steen Jr. as Daniel Gasman Smestad
Grethe Kausland as Ruth Frantzen
Minken Fosheim as Vigdis Reverud

Recurring
Turid Balke as Mrs. Smith
Eldar Vågan as Torstein
Wenche Foss as Karl and Vigdis' mother

Plot
Following the events of the last episode of Mot i brøstet, Karl moves out of his old house and into a new apartment in downtown Oslo. There he gets acquainted with the chairman Ulf, the janitor Smestad and the cleaning maid Mrs. Frantzen. His sister Vigdis also comes to visit frequently.

Episodes

Tusenårsfesten 
Tusenårsfesten was a direct-to-video special released in 1999, featuring characters of both Karl&Co and its predecessor, Mot i Brøstet. Originally 56 minutes, it was edited down to a double episode (running 47 minutes in total) for television and DVD. These cuts have made VHS copies and rips attractive as it is the only unedited version available.

The episodes see Karl and the other tenants planning a big party to celebrate the end of the millennia, when circumstances cause a reunion between Karl and Nils, triggering a big party with all their old friends invited.

DVD releases
Karl & Co was released as a "Complete Series"-set on October 24, 2007.

References

External links 
 

Norwegian television sitcoms
Television spin-offs
1998 Norwegian television series debuts
2001 Norwegian television series endings
TV 2 (Norway) original programming
1990s Norwegian television series
2000s Norwegian television series